Léonard Joseph Fontaine (February 25, 1948 – March 25, 2019) was a Canadian ice hockey player who played 46 games in the National Hockey League for the Detroit Red Wings during the 1972–73 and 1973–74 seasons and 21 games in the World Hockey Association for the Michigan Stags/Baltimore Blades during the 1974–75 season. The rest of his career, which lasted from 1968 to 1983, was mainly spent in the minor International Hockey League.

Career statistics

Regular season and playoffs

References

External links

 

1948 births
2019 deaths
Canadian ice hockey right wingers
Detroit Red Wings players
Flint Generals players
Ice hockey people from Quebec City
Michigan Stags players
Port Huron Flags players
Port Huron Wings players
Toledo Goaldiggers players
Virginia Wings players